Tavau Teii is a political figure from the Pacific nation of Tuvalu.

Election
After standing unsuccessfully for Parliament in the 2002 general election in the constituency of Niutao, Teii won a by-election on 5 May 2003 triggered by the death of the incumbent.

Deputy Prime Minister of Tuvalu

He was Deputy Prime Minister of Tuvalu in the government of Apisai Ielemia. His ministerial portfolio included that of Minister of Natural Resources.

Teii lost his bid for re-election in the 2010 Tuvaluan general election. He was a candidate in the 2015 Tuvaluan general election and received 90 votes, but was not elected to parliament. He was a candidate in the  2019 general election, but was not elected to parliament.

United Nations appearances
During his tenure as Minister of Natural Resources and Environment, Teii attended the Nairobi Climate Change Summit held in November 2006. As Deputy Prime Minister Teii represented Tuvalu to discuss the implications of climate change at the United Nations High-Level Event on Climate Change at the United Nations General Assembly, between 29 September 2007 and 1 October 2007.  Teii proposed possible changes to the Kyoto Protocol to be discussed at the Bali Climate Change Conference held between 3 and 15 December 2007.

In his speech on 29 September 2007, Teii declared that "Tuvalu is highly vulnerable to the impacts of climate change so we are seeking new funding arrangements to protect us from the impacts of climate change," and "Rather than relying on aid money we believe that the major greenhouse polluters should pay for the impacts they are causing."

See also

 Politics of Tuvalu

References

External links 
 Appointment of Government of Apisai Ielemia in 2006

Living people
Deputy Prime Ministers of Tuvalu
Members of the Parliament of Tuvalu
People from Niutao
Year of birth missing (living people)